Maria Cecília & Rodolfo are a Brazilian country music duo called Música sertaneja, formed by Maria Cecília Serenza Ferreira Alves and Rodolfo Trelha Jacques de Carvalho.

History 
Cecília and Rodolfo met in 2007 while at the University Don Bosco in Campo Grande, state of Mato Grosso do Sul, where the two were taking the course in Zootechny. They began singing in the school hallways before deciding to pursue music as a career. They started playing at fairs held by the university and in bars. Sponsored by Jorge & Mateus , they recorded their first promotional CD You Back in 2008. The following year (2009), they released their second album and first DVD, released by Som Livre in Goiania. From there, their career began to take off, gaining considerable success. Today, they're one of the most promising pairs from the scene of Brazilian country music.

Recently the duo recorded their latest effort, a CD that was recorded at Estoril Club and was attended by guests from the fan clubs of the pair. Recently (August 13/14, 2010 live in São Paulo) was recording the new CD and DVD MC & R, containing the hits "Bye Bye" and "The Days Go”. On December 2, 2010, Maria Cecília e Rodolfo launched the new single from the new CD / DVD, the song "The Payback" with participation of members of the samba group Exaltasamba

Discography 
Albums

Videography

Singles

References

Sertanejo music groups
Country music duos
Musical groups established in 2008
Brazilian musical duos
Male–female musical duos
People from Campo Grande